The Standing Council of Scottish Chiefs (SCSC) is the organisation that represents the Chiefs of many prominent Scottish Clans and Families. It describes itself as "the definitive and authoritative body for information on the Scottish Clan System".

History
The Standing Council of Scottish Chiefs was founded in 1952 by Diana Hay, 23rd Countess of Erroll, who at the time held the title of Lord High Constable of Scotland.  The present Convenor is Donald MacLaren, Chief of the Clan MacLaren.  The objectives of the SCSC are stated in its constitution:
The Objects of the Council, which is non-political, are to consider matters affecting Scottish Chiefs and the Clans and Names which they represent and to submit their views and interests to HM Government, to Departments of State, the Scottish Government, to Local Authorities, to Press and Public, to Associations connected with Clan and Family in Britain and overseas; also to educate the general public in matters connected with the rights, functions and historical position of Scottish Chiefs, together with the Clans and Names which they represent and to take such steps as may seem expedient to protect the titles, armorial bearings or other insignia of Chiefs from exploitation or misuse in trade or otherwise.

Non-members
The following chiefs have, by their own request, been removed as members of the Standing Council of Scottish Chiefs:
Duke of Fife, Chief of Carnegie
Charles Fergusson, Chief of Fergusson
Earl Haig, Chief of Haig
Earl of Crawford and Balcarres, Chief of Lindsay
David Menzies, Chief of Menzies
Duke of Atholl, Chief of Murray
Earl of Gowrie, Chief of Ruthven

See also
Standing Council of Irish Chiefs and Chieftains

References

External links
The Standing Council of Scottish Chiefs website

Organisations based in Edinburgh